Rosie is a 1965 Indian Malayalam-language film,  directed by P. N. Menon and produced by Mani Swami. The film stars Prem Nazir, Kaviyoor Ponnamma, Thikkurissy Sukumaran Nair and P. J. Antony. The film had musical score by K. V. Job. Rosie was one of the first Malayalam films to be shot completely outdoors.

Cast
Prem Nazir
Kaviyoor Ponnamma
Thikkurissy Sukumaran Nair
P. J. Antony
T. S. Muthaiah
D. K. Chellappan
Vijayanirmala

Soundtrack
The music was composed by K. V. Job and the lyrics were written by P. Bhaskaran.

References

External links
 

1965 films
1960s Malayalam-language films
1965 directorial debut films
Films directed by P. N. Menon (director)